Rivington School was a movement that emerged from the East Village art scene in the 1980s in New York City. Most of the artists of the Rivington School were either involved in welding, forging, performance or street painting. The group started in 1983 and named themselves after an abandoned public school house building located on Rivington Street. The group is most noted for "massive junk sculpture installations on the Lower East Side,"  and other forms of metal public sculpture.

Sculpture Gardens
Many public and guerilla sculpture spaces emerged from the Rivington School, most notably the Rivington Sculpture Garden, originally constructed on Rivington Street near Forsyth Street.  It was started by early founder "Cowboy" Ray Kelly.  Due to the unpermitted nature of the work, the Rivington Sculpture Garden was regularly knocked down by the city.  Eventually it found a home at 6th Street, between Avenue B and Avenue C; and the Corragio Studio, more commonly known as "2B" or "The Garage", started by another early founder of the movement, Linus Coraggio. The name "2B" refers to its location at 2nd Street and Avenue B in the East Village of New York City, on which a condominium building now stands. The construction and destruction of the Rivington Sculpture Garden was documented by Monty Cantsin aka Istvan Kantor on super8film "ANTI CREDO".

Early artists
Among the early artists of the Rivington School were Toyo Tsuchiya, Monty Cantsin aka Istvan Kantor, Shalom Neuman, Paolo Buggiani, Jacek Tylicki and Ena Paul Kostabi.

See also
Adam Purple

Bibliography

 C. Carr, On edge: performance at the end of the twentieth century. , Wesleyan University Press, 2008
 “Local History: The Battle for Bohemia in the East Village” (with James Cornwell), chapter in Julie Ault, ed., Alternative Art New York, 1965-1985 (University of Minnesota Press, 2002)
 Holland Cotter, “Art in Review: Toyo Tsuchiya, 'Six O'Clock Observed',” New York Times, June 18, 1999.
 New Art Examiner, Volume 17, Chicago, Pennsylvania, and Washington, D.C. New Art Associations, 1989
 Richard Armijo, “Rivington Street Style,” East Informer, no. 2, 1987.

References

External links

American art movements
Culture of Manhattan
East Village, Manhattan